
Gmina Tłuszcz is an urban-rural gmina (administrative district) in Wołomin County, Masovian Voivodeship, in east-central Poland.

Villages
Apart from the town of Tłuszcz, Gmina Tłuszcz contains the villages and settlements of Białki, Brzezinów, Chrzęsne, Dzięcioły, Franciszków, Grabów, Jadwinin, Jarzębia Łąka, Jasienica, Jaźwie, Kozły, Kury, Łysobyki, Mokra Wieś, Pawłów, Postoliska, Rudniki, Rysie, Stasinów, Stryjki, Szczepanek, Szymanówek, Wagan, Waganka, Wólka Kozłowska and Zalesie.

Neighbouring gminas
Gmina Tłuszcz is bordered by the gminas of Dąbrówka, Jadów, Klembów, Poświętne, Strachówka and Zabrodzie.

References

Polish official population figures 2006

Tluszcz
Wołomin County